Hydrophis nigrocinctus is a species of marine venomous snakes in the family Elapidae (Hydrophiinae-sea snake).

Habitat
This species is found in the Indian Ocean and Bay of Bengal: Bangladesh, India, Malaysia, Myanmar (Burma), Sri Lanka and  Thailand. 
Type locality: Sundarbans, Bengal.

References
 Heatwole, H. 1999 Sea snakes, 2nd ed. Krieger, Malabar, 148 pp.
 Rasmussen,A.R. 1997 Systematics of sea snakes: a critical review. In: Thorpe,R.S., Wüster,W. & Malhotra,A. (eds.) Venomous snakes - ecology, evolution and snakebite. Clarendon Press (Oxford)/Symp. zool. Soc. Lond. 70: 15-30

External links
 .
 Catalogue of Life: 18 May 2015 (http://www.catalogueoflife.org/col/details/species/id/13207817 ).

nigrocinctus
Snakes of Asia
Reptiles of Bangladesh
Reptiles of India
Reptiles of Myanmar
Reptiles described in 1803
Taxa named by François Marie Daudin